Lee Hein (born March 13, 1960) is an American politician from Iowa. Hein is a Republican member of the Iowa House of Representatives from District 96.

Early life 
On March 13, 1960, Hein was born in Monticello, Iowa.

Education 
Hein attended Iowa State University.

Career 
On November 2, 2010 Hein won the election and became a member of the Iowa House of Representatives for District 31.

Personal life 
Hein's wife is Jacky. They have two children.

References

External links 
 Lee He in at ballotpedia.org
Iowa Republicans bio of Hein

1960 births
Iowa State University alumni
Republican Party members of the Iowa House of Representatives
Living people
People from Monticello, Iowa
21st-century American politicians